Fonda House is a historic home located at Cohoes in Albany County, New York.  It was built about 1727 and is a rectangular -story, three-by-two-bay center entrance brick dwelling with a gambrel roof.  It features a single-story wraparound porch.

It was listed on the National Register of Historic Places in 2004.

References

Houses on the National Register of Historic Places in New York (state)
Houses completed in 1727
Houses in Albany County, New York
National Register of Historic Places in Albany County, New York